Geoffrey Brooke  (25 April 1920 – 6 January 2009) was a British modern pentathlete. He competed at the 1948 Summer Olympics.

Personal life
He survived the sinking of the latter in December 1941 and managed to escape Singapore in February 1942.

References

1920 births
2009 deaths
British male modern pentathletes
Olympic modern pentathletes of Great Britain
Modern pentathletes at the 1948 Summer Olympics
Sportspeople from Bath, Somerset
Royal Navy officers of World War II
Recipients of the Distinguished Service Cross (United Kingdom)
People from Balcombe, West Sussex